Chicken Bristle is an unincorporated community in Douglas County, Illinois, United States.

Chicken Bristle has been noted for its unusual place name.

References

Unincorporated communities in Douglas County, Illinois
Unincorporated communities in Illinois